Isobel Katherine Stevens, M.D. is a fictional character from the medical drama television series Grey's Anatomy, which airs on the American Broadcasting Company (ABC) in the United States. The character was created by series producer Shonda Rhimes, and was portrayed by actress Katherine Heigl from 2005 to 2010. Introduced as a surgical intern at the fictional Seattle Grace Hospital, Izzie worked her way up to resident level, while her relationships with her colleagues Meredith Grey (Ellen Pompeo), Cristina Yang (Sandra Oh), Alex Karev (Justin Chambers) and George O'Malley (T. R. Knight) formed a focal point of the series.

Heigl garnered high critical acclaim for her performance as Izzie and received numerous awards and nominations for her role, winning the Outstanding Supporting Actress in a Drama Series at the 59th Primetime Emmy Awards in 2007. She was critical of the character's development during the show's fourth season, particularly her romance with her on-screen best friend George. She declined to pursue a nomination for the 2008 Emmy Awards, citing insufficient material in the role. After speculation that Izzie would be killed off in the fifth season, the character was diagnosed with Stage 4 metastatic melanoma. She married Alex in the series' 100th episode, and afterwards, her tumor was successfully removed. Heigl made her final series regular appearance as Izzie in the sixth season, leaving Seattle after Alex refused to resume their marriage. The actress requested to be released from her contract 18 months early, in order to spend more time with her family. Ten years after her final appearance, the character's fate was revealed in a season 16 episode, where she makes a visual cameo re-appearance.

Storylines

Background
Isobel Katherine "Izzie" Stevens (born 1980) is the daughter of a single mother named Robbie (Sharon Lawrence). They lived together in a trailer park, and Stevens was affectionately nicknamed "Cricket" by her mother. A teenage pregnant patient of hers named Cheynne (Regine Nehy) identifies her trailer as being situated behind a church. Her maternal grandmother died of thyroid cancer sometime before her surgical residency. Growing up, Izzie was encouraged to go into the medical field by her high school biology teacher, Dr. Singer (Joel Grey).

When Izzie was 15, she became pregnant with her first biological child, Hannah Klein (Liv Hutchings) and this caused her to have friction with cheerleaders at her high school. In his Alzheimer's state, Dr. Singer recognizes the father of her child as a fellow high school student. She placed the child for adoption at age 16 after giving birth in 1996. Izzie privately named her daughter Sarah despite her adoptive parents naming her Hannah. Two years later, Stevens departed her hometown of Chehalis, Washington at age 18 and never returned until her third year of residency. After snooping through her file, Lexie Grey (Chyler Leigh) also discovers Stevens attended night school for college and consequently took six years to finish her undergraduate degree.

Summary
Izzie is introduced as a 25-year-old former model in the first episode of Grey's Anatomy, meeting fellow surgical interns Meredith, Cristina, Alex, and George. She and George move in with Meredith and become best friends. Izzie's boyfriend, hockey player Hank (Jonathan Scarfe), struggles to accept her new role as a surgeon, and the two break up. Izzie is hurt when Alex exposes her past as a lingerie model. However, the two later go on to begin a friendship, and then a romance. Alex experiences sexual dysfunction with Izzie and cheats on her with nurse Olivia Harper (Sarah Utterback). When Izzie finds out, she breaks up with him, though they briefly reunite following a bomb incident at the hospital. Izzie falls in love with cardiothoracic patient Denny Duquette (Jeffrey Dean Morgan), and the two become engaged. When Denny's condition deteriorates, Izzie deliberately worsens his health further by cutting his LVAD wire to move him up the UNOS donor register. Although Denny receives a new heart, he has a stroke hours later and dies. Izzie is the sole beneficiary of Denny's will, inheriting $8.7 million. She uses the money to open a free clinic at the hospital: the Denny Duquette Memorial Clinic.

Izzie disapproves of George's relationship with and marriage to orthopedic resident Callie Torres (Sara Ramirez). She and George sleep together, and attempt to keep their liaison a secret. George and resident Miranda Bailey (Chandra Wilson) are the only ones made aware that Izzie gave her child up for adoption at age 16. He supports Izzie when an 11-year-old Hannah, diagnosed with leukemia, arrives at Seattle Grace Hospital in need of a bone marrow transplant from Izzie. Izzie's feelings for George grow, and she reveals that she has fallen in love with him. The fourth season premiere "A Change Is Gonna Come" sees 28-year-old Stevens and her peers, except George, promoted to second-year residents. When Callie discovers George has been unfaithful, the two separate, and George and Izzie embark on a short-lived relationship, only to discover there is no real chemistry between them, and they decide to end their relationship and remain friends. Izzie supports Alex when he discovers his new girlfriend, Rebecca (Elizabeth Reaser) has psychiatric problems, and convinces him to have her committed. She is also handed primary responsibility for the clinic, as Bailey cuts back on her responsibilities.

Midway through second year, Izzie celebrates her 29th birthday. Around this timeframe, she and Alex have rekindled their intern year relationship but Izzie grows increasingly concerned when she begins hallucinating Denny. Ultimately she discovers she has Stage 4 metastatic melanoma that has already spread to her liver, skin and brain, causing the hallucinations. Her survival chances are estimated at only 5%. She is admitted to Seattle Grace as a patient. Bailey says Dr. Parker, an unseen obstetrician, will harvest healthy eggs before she undergoes any radiation so she has the option of having babies for later. Alex is upset about having to ejaculate into a cup to create embryos as he wanted them to have children naturally. Derek Shepherd (Patrick Dempsey) successfully removes a tumor from her brain, and Alex informs her he fertilized the eggs. Izzie spends her time in the hospital planning Meredith and Derek's wedding, but when her condition worsens and Derek discovers a second brain tumor, they give the ceremony to Izzie and Alex, who marry in front of all their friends. The procedure to remove the second tumor from Izzie's brain causes her to lose her short-term memory, and although she soon regains it, she flatlines moments later. Her friends ignore her DNR order and attempt to resuscitate her. She dreams herself on an elevator to the afterlife meeting George, who is also flatlining after being hit by a bus. Though George dies, Izzie is resuscitated and recovers enough to return to work.

Izzie is subsequently cut from the surgical program after making a treatment error that endangers the life of a patient. Believing Alex is to blame for her firing, she writes him a Dear John letter and leaves. After Meredith informs Izzie that Alex is moving on, she returns in a midway to make amends and apologize for her mistake in believing Alex was responsible for her firing. After a scan, she informs Alex that she no longer has cancer. Although he is pleased, Alex officially breaks up with Izzie, telling her that he loves her but deserves better. He then urges her to leave, be happy, and not come back. Thus Izzie leaves Seattle forever to start afresh.

Aftermath
Seven episodes after Heigl's final appearance as the character, Alex informs Meredith that Izzie sent divorce papers. He signs them another two episodes later in the season 6 episode "How Insensitive". In the sixth-season finale, Alex is shot and asks for Izzie. Imagining that Lexie is Izzie, he apologizes and asks her never to leave him again.

In the season 12 episode "I Choose You", Alex's later-second wife (Camilla Luddington) finds an invoice from the fertility clinic that housed Izzie and Alex's fertilized embryos from when she had cancer and ponders the possibility that he has children with Izzie. In the season 12 finale "Family Affair", Alex goes through a relationship break-up ponders if you can only get one soulmate, referring to Izzie. The season 14 episode, "Who Lives, Who Dies, Who Tells Your Story" serves as the 300th episode which sees Alex affected by the appearance of an Izzie doppelganger named Liza (Eryn Rea) who repeats a common Izzie catchphrase "Seriously?". He subsequently reveals to his soon-wife Jo—who urges him to call Izzie—that he never found out what happened to his ex-wife. He prefers to envision his own fantasy of a perfect life for her, married with three children and always smiling, now that he has moved on and is happy with his new partner. In the season 16 episode "Leave a Light On", it is revealed that Izzie reconciled with her ex-husband ten years after their divorce. Izzie is discovered to be a surgical oncologist living on a farm in Kansas raising 5-year-old twins named Alexis and Eli, who were born as a result of Izzie moving forward with IVF five to six years earlier. In the 400th episode "You Are the Blood", Meredith imagines Izzie several times in snippets of her fragmented memories of the hospital as she reflects on her story in reverse upon being named chief of surgery.

Development

Casting and creation

Izzie was created by Grey's Anatomy producer Shonda Rhimes, with actress Katherine Heigl cast in the role. Heigl originally wanted to play Izzie as a brunette, but was requested to retain her natural blond for the part. For the audition process, she tried to appear smart by wearing a sweater and glasses and putting her hair up in a bun. She even considered dying her hair brunette to "trick" Rhimes and Horton into thinking she could play a doctor. 

Peter Horton stated that while they considered other actresses, "Katie came in and just ... obliterated it." He also noted the difficulty in finding an actress both beautiful and someone "who can really act". Stacy McKee revealed that the reason they dropped Izzie as having worn glasses after the pilot episode was due to the "nightmare" of the glasses reflecting in the lighting when shooting scenes. Heigl's comprehension of medical procedures and terminology is slight; the actress explained that while she has an admiration for doctors, she is not as fascinated by medicine as other cast members. When Kate Walsh's character Addison Montgomery left Grey's Anatomy to launch the spin-off show Private Practice, Heigl disclosed that she had hoped for a spin-off for Izzie.

Heigl declined to put her name forward for a fourth season episode of Grey's Anatomy as consideration at the 60th Primetime Emmy Awards in 2008, claiming that she had been given insufficient material on the season to warrant a nomination. Following Heigl's statement, speculation arose that her character would suffer a brain tumor and be killed off Grey's Anatomy, substantiated by the announcement Jeffrey Dean Morgan would return to the series as Denny, who died at the end of season 2. ABC's entertainment president Steve McPherson denied the rumor, stating: "There is an unbelievable storyline for her this year, which is really central to everything that's going to go on this season". In 2010, Heigl clarified that she clarified she was not "snubbing the Emmys", calling her 2007 win the "highlight of [her] career" and regretted making the statement. She stated that she made it out of fear of a "No comment" answer making her sound uninterested in entering the race. Commenting further, she remarked: "I could have more gracefully said that without going into a private work matter. It was between me and the writers. I ambushed them, and it wasn’t very nice or fair."

Speculation resumed, however, when Dean Morgan returned to the show for a second time in its fifth season. Cast member James Pickens, Jr. announced that both Heigl and T. R. Knight were set to depart from the show, but he later retracted his comment. During the course of the fifth season, Izzie was diagnosed with Stage 4 metastatic melanoma which spread to her liver, skin and brain. Following the show's 100th episode wrap-up party, Heigl revealed she did not know if Izzie would survive, as no one on the production team would disclose her character's fate to her. It was confirmed in June 2009 that Heigl would return as Izzie for the show's sixth season. Heigl's appearances in the season were sporadic, seeing Izzie depart and return twice.

Film project leave and maternity leave
Beginning in September 2009, Heigl was granted an extended leave for five episodes of the sixth season (from episode six's "I Saw What I Saw" to episode eleven's "Blink") to shoot the romantic comedy film Life As We Know It (2010), her first executive producer project as an actress. It was confirmed her exit would coincide with lead actress Ellen Pompeo's own maternity leave, and also shortly following T.R. Knight's departure from the series. Showrunner Shonda Rhimes admitted, "Eventually, everybody is going to leave the show,” admitted the exec, citing T.R. Knight’s exit and the temporary loss of Pompeo. ”So we’re looking at [ways] we can mess with the structure now. Season 6 is about finding the longevity of the show and figuring out if there is a future for this show beyond these characters.”

Pompeo's titular character, Meredith Grey was given reduced screentime, with scenes filmed in advance for future episodes. Heigl's character, however, was given a purposeful exit storyline. The character is fired in the fifth episode of the season "Invasion" and leaves her husband, Alex with a Dear John note. She is subsequently absent for the following three episodes. Stevens briefly returns for the ninth episode "New History", before departing again. After the release of the eleventh episode "Blink", Heigl wrapped up shooting Life As We Know It and returned for the twelfth episode, "I Like You So Much Better When You're Naked", set to air in January 2010.

In November 2009, it was announced, however, Heigl had taken an indefinite, extended maternity leave to care of her adopted daughter, and the twelfth episode would serve as a further phasing out. It was later revealed to be a three-month maternity leave and Rhimes confirmed Heigl would not shoot scenes in advance for her character like Pompeo.

Decision to leave
On March 1, 2010, Katherine Heigl was scheduled to return to the Grey's set to shoot the twentieth episode of the sixth season, and the subsequent four episodes. Negotiations had been ongoing "for months" between Heigl and ABC regarding her commitment to the series. In the same week, both sides mutually agreed that the best solution would be to "part ways now as opposed to at the end of the season", which became public news on March 11. Heigl further stated she "spoke again" to Rhimes about leaving before she was due back, and then waited at home in Utah until she was given the "formal okay" notice that she would no longer be a part of the series.

Heigl requested to be released from her contract 18 months early, and to retroactively make her final appearance be the twelfth episode of the season (her maternity leave departure episode), "I Like You So Much Better When You're Naked" which aired on January 21, 2010. In April 2010, she stated that the episode — while not intended to be her final episode — "oddly works as a bookend to Izzie's story". She further commented:
 "Even though there's a part of me that would like to go back and do the quick Izzie farewell, I also think that my last scene — where Meredith says to Izzie, 'Please don't go, This is your home,' and Izzie's response was, 'No it’s not, not anymore it’s just a place I worked and I can do that anywhere' — was kind of tragic and appropriate all at the same time. When I was playing the scene, I was really trying to convey that, for Izzie, that was a lie that she had to tell herself to have the courage to have to move on."

While a source within the actress’ camp claimed Heigl “was at home and ready to return to work" on March 1, another stated it was "much more complicated than that". Headwriter Krista Vernoff (who later became sole showrunner) revealed in 2020 that she penned one late-season six farewell episode "entirely centered on [Izzie] and the completion of her story arc", as well as her relationship with Alex, describing it as "beautiful"; it was subsequently canned and heavily re-written after the production received a call that "Katie wasn't coming" and "Wasn't going to do it". However, a source within Heigl's camp disputed this claim, responding that she had returned to LA from Utah waiting to be called to set. Heigl had also previously stated in March 2010 that the rumors that she refused to return were untrue. She instead simply waited to be formally approved to be legally released from her contract, which she was subsequently approved for.

On March 24, 2010, Katherine Heigl announced that the decision to leave was made out of shifted priorities; she no longer desired to work full-time and also needed to establish a stronger bond with her adoptive child. She also did not think it would be respectful to Grey's Anatomy viewers to have Izzie return and depart yet again (after doing so twice previously in the same season). She revealed that she had "just finalized [her] agreement" with ABC, and further stated: "Everyone had been working really hard to find an amicable and gracious way of letting go and moving on. It’s sad but it’s what I wanted.” The eighteenth episode "Suicide is Painless" released the following day became Heigl's final credited appearance, despite not appearing in the episode. In the nineteenth episode "Sympathy for the Parents", Heigl's name is removed from the main cast for the first time since the pilot episode, and Kim Raver who previously recurred as Dr. Teddy Altman is added, following a January 2010 announcement of her promotion.

Post-exit

In August 2010, Rhimes stated that she did not feel Izzie's character arc—specifically her relationship with Alex—had fully concluded, and hoped to give proper closure to their relationship in the seventh season. She later confirmed that she had intended to kill off Izzie off-screen, but opted against this a day later as she felt that it would destroy Alex, rather than give him closure. Instead, she concluded: "I'm open to seeing Izzie again. So if she [Katherine] were to come back, we would be thrilled to [wrap up her story]. But if she doesn't, we'll just move on." In the How to Save a Life: The Inside Story of Grey's Anatomy (2021) book, former writer Jenna Bans stated that Izzie was kept alive because "Shonda [Rhimes] felt like that was more of an unexpected way to go."

Heigl also went on to say in October 2010 that a return looked bleak because she could not think of "any way that [Izzie] could come back gracefully that wouldn't just feel manipulative". She stated it was "hard" because she wonders "what she's doing and where she is and what happened, but that is over for me now", and expressed further admiration for her on-screen husband, Chambers and their characters' romantic coupling.

However, in January 2012, Heigl stated in an interview that she has asked the producers if she could return to the show to give closure to Izzie's storyline: "I've told them I want to [return]," she said. "I really, really, really want to see where [Izzie] is. I just want to know what happened to her and where she went and what she's doing now. My idea is that she actually like figures it out, and finds some success and does really well in a different hospital. She was always floundering you know, and so she was always one step behind the eight ball and I want to see that girl take some power back." She later went on to say that she regrets leaving the show, "Oh yeah, sometimes, yeah. You miss it. I miss my friends. It was a great work environment... and it becomes a family. I spent six years together with these people every day... you grow up together, in a way," and again commented on Izzie's possibly returning to the show, "I always felt that if they wanted me to come back and sort of wrap up that storyline... I want them to know that I'm down with it if they want me to, but I completely understand if it doesn't necessarily work... They've got a lot of story lines going on there." But in March 2012, Shonda Rhimes said that there are no plans at the moment for the character to return, "I think it was really nice to hear her appreciating the show. At the same time we are on a track we have been planning. The idea of changing that track is not something we are interested in right now." 3 years later, Rhimes said she has completely moved on from the idea of Izzie coming back, "I’m done with that story. I’ve turned that idea over in my mind a thousand times and thought about how it would go. And I don’t think so."

After her exit, Izzie makes uncredited archive footage re-appearances in "Flight", "Leave A Light On" and "You Are the Blood". For the 300th episode, "Who Lives, Who Dies, Who Tells Your Story", showrunner Krista Vernoff wanted to incorporate a nostaglia-fuelled storyline. Izzie returned "in spirit" for the episode with a doppelganger character, Liza (portrayed by Eryn Rea), alongside George and Cristina doppelgangers, Greg and Cleo. Initially, Vernoff pitched to Rhimes (who still had executive producer privileges) an original main cast member from the pilot returning as the focal point storyline for the episode after noticing the Izzie lookalike actress, Eryn Rea (who was a Meredith stand-in) through the camera during the early-fourteenth season scenes shot in Seattle. Vernoff observed:
 "Every time I walked past the camera, I gasped because I felt like I had traveled back in time. She looked so much like first-season Izzie to me. ... We were talking about: Can we get one of the originals, that’s obviously where you start. Well, no you can’t, you try and you can’t and there are a million reasons why you can’t. So you move on. Then it becomes a conversation of how do we get the feeling of a visit from the originals without a visit from the originals."

The original cast member was heavily rumored to be Heigl, and Vernoff further stated she was unable to allow the cast member to return for a "million reasons", remaining tight-lipped about who the series regular was to be. She then pitched a storyline about "doppelgangers" which was approved instead.

In 2020, showrunner Krista Vernoff discussed the possibility of Chambers and Heigl returning together after the former's off-screen departure stating, "When I left the show in season 7, people asked me if there was any chance of me ever coming back. “I was smart enough to say, ‘Never say never.’ Here I am, so who knows?” In 2021, Heigl herself said she did not know if she would ever re-appear in the series, but also said "never say never".

Characterization
Heigl believes that the Grey's Anatomy writers incorporate much of the actors' personalities into their roles, and that Izzie is a "super-moral" version of herself. The episode "Bring the Pain", which aired as the fifth episode of the second season, was originally intended to be the final episode of the first season. Rhimes explained that Izzie's character in this episode came "full-circle" from her role in the pilot: "Izzie, so vulnerable and underestimated when we first meet her, is the girl who removes her heart from her sleeve in 'Bring the Pain'." Discussing Izzie's personality in a 2006 Cosmopolitan interview, Heigl assessed that she is "immensely kind and patient". When Denny died in the season finale "Losing My Religion", Rhimes discussed the impact it had on Izzie, noting that Izzie is forced to abandon her idealism, which in turn leads to her letting go of medicine. In the aftermath of Denny's death, Heigl came to believe that Izzie was not cut out to be a doctor. Executive producer Betsy Beers explained, however, that Denny's death served to make Izzie more mature, and Heigl affirmed that "At the beginning of the [third] season they were trying to show how lost Izzie was. She lost her optimism. She realizes now that life is difficult, but she still tries very hard to see the best in people." In order to demonstrate Izzie's dislike of George's love-interest Callie, Rhimes penned a scene which she deemed one of her favorite moments on the show, in which Callie urinates in front of a stunned Izzie and Meredith. Rhimes assessed that: "I love that Izzie and Mer respond with all the trauma of having viewed a car-crash ... the point is Callie pees and Izzie tortures her a tiny bit about the hand-washing and that made me overjoyed because that’s the kind of thing people do."

Discussing Izzie's relationship with Alex in a 2006 Cosmopolitan interview, Heigl assessed that "Even when Alex was a complete dirtbag to her [Izzie], she forgave him and gave him another chance. And he really screwed her over. ... To go for a guy like that is to say I want to be damaged.'" Writer Stacy McKee deemed Izzie's moving on from Alex to patient Denny Duquette "karma", as Alex previously treated Izzie badly, yet as he begins to realize his true feelings, he is forced to watch her embark on a romance with "the undeniably-handsome-and-totally-charming" Denny. Series writer Blythe Robe commented on Izzie and Denny: "I love the way Izzie lights up when she's around him. I love their relationship because it's so pure and honest and completely game free." Writer Elizabeth Klaviter noted at this time the way Izzie "seems to be sacrificing her reputation because of her feelings for Denny." When Izzie deliberately worsened Denny's condition to move him up the transplant list, series writer Mark Wilding questioned the morality of the actions, asking: "is Izzie bad for doing it? Is she tremendously irresponsible? She cut the LVAD wire for love, so does that make her action understandable?"

Rhimes discussed costuming choices in the scene which saw the interns gather around Denny's deathbed, explaining: "Meredith and George and Cristina and Callie and Alex are all dressed, not for a prom, but for a funeral. Everyone in dark colors, everyone dressed sombrely. As if they were in mourning. Only Izzie is in happy pink. Only Izzie looks like she didn’t know this was coming." Following Denny's death, Heigl approached Rhimes to ask when her character would next have a romantic liaison. Rhimes explained that "Izzie doesn't sleep around". Heigl expressed a desire for Izzie to reunite with Alex, explaining: "I believe on some level, there's a connection between Izzie and Alex. He can do honorable things even though he's cutting and sarcastic. I would like to ultimately see them together, if not this season, then next."

Yahoo! Voices wrote that Stevens in the third season "has become more condescending and passive-aggressive herself, more than anyone else." Heigl was critical of her character's development in the show's fourth season, particularly her affair with George, which she deemed "a ratings-ploy". Heigl explained: "They really hurt somebody, and they didn't seem to be taking a lot of responsibility for it. I have a really hard time with that kind of thing. I'm maybe a little too black and white about it. I don't really know Izzie very well right now. She's changed a lot." Attempting to rationalise Izzie's actions, Heigl later assessed that: People who are so infallible, perfect and moral tend to be the first to slip and fall. But I would love to see how she deals with the consequences of what she's done, because what’s interesting is when people make decisions that shake their world, they suddenly have to go, 'Woo, I didn't know I was capable of this.' I'd like to see Izzie take some culpability.

In June 2010, Heigl spoke of her character after departing amid the sixth season stating, "I felt very protective of Izzie. I really loved her. I felt she was an admirable woman who certainly made mistakes. But I was starting to not like her, and that bothered me."

Reception
Heigl was nominated for the Best Supporting Actress in a TV Series award at the 2007 and 2008 Golden Globe Awards for her role as Izzie Stevens. She was named "Favorite Female TV Star" at the 34th People's Choice Awards, and awarded the Outstanding Supporting Actress in a Drama Series at the 2007 Emmy Awards, becoming the only star-billed cast member of the show to have received a Primetime Emmy Award. Prior to the ceremony, considering Heigl's chances of winning the Emmy, Variety's Stuart Levine assessed of her performance: "Heigl has little difficulty reaching Izzie's highest highs and lowest lows. Showrunner Shonda Rhimes puts a lot of pressure on Heigl to carry many intense storylines, and she's up to the challenge." Levine also noted, however: "There are times when Izzie becomes completely irrational during crisis situations, which may bother some." Fox News included Izzie in its list of "The Best TV Doctors For Surgeon General". The character was listed in Wetpaints "10 Hottest Female Doctors on TV" and in BuzzFeeds "16 Hottest Doctors On Television".

During the show's third season, the New York Post Robert Rorke deemed Izzie to be "the heart-and-soul" of Grey's Anatomy. He deemed her the show's heroine, and wrote that: "Izzie is a welcome, calming presence, despite the devastation she experienced when she failed to save her patient and fiancé Denny Duquette. ... Besides the formidable Dr. Bailey played by Chandra Wilson, Izzie seems to be the only adult intern at Seattle Grace; the character has achieved a depth lacking in her fellow interns." Eyder Peralta of The Houston Chronicle was critical of Izzie's ethics in cutting Denny's LVAD wire, writing that she "should not be practising medicine" and stating: "That's the reason I don't watch Grey's Anatomy, anymore, because the super-hot blond chick can make an earth-shattering, fatal decision and she doesn't get canned."

The season 4 romance between Izzie and George proved to be highly unpopular with viewers, and resulted in a fan backlash among Izzie and Alex fans. The return of Izzie's deceased fiancé Denny and the resumption of their romance during the show's fifth season also proved unpopular with fans, and was deemed "the world's worst storyline" by Mary McNamara of the Los Angeles Times. McNamara was also critical of the fifth season finale episode "Now or Never", which saw Izzie flatline following neurosurgery, opining that Izzie ought to die. The episode in which Izzie married long-term love Alex received 15.3 million viewers, the largest television audience of the night. Their off-screen reunion in the sixteenth season received a polarizing response from fans. Deadline remarked "fan-favorite" Alex's ending's similarities to that of ER's Doug and Carol, played by George Clooney and Julianna Margulies respectively, "who also left the show at different times" and there "Carol also had given birth to the couple’s twins unbeknownst to Doug, with the couple eventually reuniting to live happily ever after with their kids".

Izzie's cancer storyline received a mixed response from the medical community. Otis Brawley, chief medical officer at the American Cancer Society, commented that Izzie's treatment options were unrealistic. Whereas in the show she was offered the drug interleukin-2, in reality the drug is never recommended to patients when melanoma has spread to the brain, as it can cause bleeding and strokes. Brawley explained that such patients would instead be offered radiosurgery. Conversely however, Tim Turnham, executive director of the Melanoma Research Foundation, praised Grey's Anatomy for bringing about greater public awareness of melanoma, stating: "We welcome the national spotlight Grey's Anatomy has created for melanoma and its efforts to encourage viewers to learn more about the importance of prevention, early detection and research."

References 

Specific

General

External links 

Grey's Anatomy characters
Fictional models
Fictional surgeons
Fictional characters from Seattle
Television characters introduced in 2005
Fictional characters with cancer
Fictional female doctors
American female characters in television